Michqavan-e Olya (also Romanized as Mīchqāvān-e ‘Olyā) is a village in Rig Rural District, in the Central District of Lordegan County, Chaharmahal and Bakhtiari Province, Iran. At the 2006 census, its population was 107, in 27 families.

References 

Populated places in Lordegan County